Follow the leader is a children's game. Players first choose a leader or "head of the line" and the remaining players (the followers) all line up behind the leader.  The leader then moves around and all the players have to mimic the leader's actions. Any players who fail to follow or mimic the leader are out of the game. When only one follower remains, that player then becomes the new leader, and the game begins anew with all players joining the line once again.

Other versions 
In 2007, The Wiggles wrote a song "Follow the Leader" about the game for The Wiggles'  album Getting Strong (Wiggle and Learn). The song was available on DVD in The Wiggles' You Make Me Feel Like Dancing.

See also 
List of traditional children's games
Simon says
Game of dares
Tag

External links 
 Follow the leader. Icebreakers Games.

Children's games